I Spy is an American television series created by Edward Montagne and Phil Reisman Jr. and made by Rean Productions, Inc. and
Guild Films. It ran from 1955–56 for a total of 39 episodes and starred Raymond Massey as Anton, the Spymaster.

References

External links
 
I Spy at CVTA with episode list

1955 American television series debuts
1956 American television series endings
First-run syndicated television programs in the United States
Black-and-white American television shows